Laura Day is an Americanwomenbased in New York City. She is most widely known for her role in the fourth season of Trading Spaces.  Her style is a combination of her outgoing personality mixed with her appreciation of classical design. Her work has been featured in such publications as The New York Times, Vogue, and Traditional Home.  She also has her own online magazine, Laura Day Living, that features her DAYly blog along with much of her work and inspirations.

References

External links
 

Living people
American interior designers
Artists from New York City
American women interior designers
Year of birth missing (living people)
21st-century American women